Peter Clark Mitchell (born October 9, 1971) is an American former professional football player who was a tight end in the National Football League (NFL) for nine seasons.  He played college football for the Boston College Eagles, and was a two-time All-American.  He played professionally for the Jacksonville Jaguars, New York Giants and Detroit Lions of the NFL.

Early years
Mitchell was born in Royal Oak, Michigan.  He is a graduate of Birmingham Brother Rice High School in Birmingham, Michigan, where he played for the Rice Warriors high school football team.

College career
Mitchell accepted an athletic scholarship to attend Boston College, where he played for the Eagles from 1991 to 1994.  He earned first-team All-American honors as a junior in 1993; as a senior in 1994, he was recognized as a consensus first-team All-American, having been a first-team selection of the Associated Press, the Walter Camp Foundation, Football Writers Association of America, Scripps-Howard, and The Sporting News.

1991: 29 catches for 398 yards with 3 TD
1992: 40 catches for 555 yards with 3 TD
1993: 66 catches for 818 yards with 7 TD
1994: 55 catches for 617 yards with 7 TD

Professional career
The Miami Dolphins selected Mitchell in the fourth round (122nd overall pick) of the 1995 NFL Draft, but traded him during training camp to the Jacksonville Jaguars in exchange for wide receiver Mike Williams. In his first four seasons for the Jags, he became the team's regular starter at tight end. In a nine-season NFL career, Mitchell played in 114 regular season games, started 63 of them, and compiled 279 receptions for 2,885 yards and 15 touchdowns.

References

External links
 Pete Mitchell – NFL.com player profile

1971 births
Living people
All-American college football players
American football tight ends
Boston College Eagles football players
Jacksonville Jaguars players
New York Giants players
Detroit Lions players
Players of American football from Michigan
Sportspeople from Royal Oak, Michigan